Melissa Jannet Clark-Reynolds  (born 25 July 1964) is a New Zealand entrepreneur, foresight practitioner, and professional director. She was awarded the Insignia of an Officer of the New Zealand Order of Merit in the 2015 Queen's Birthday Honours with the citation "for services to the technology industry".

Personal life 
Aged 15, Clark-Reynolds became the then-youngest woman to ever attend university in New Zealand. While still a student, she was a single mother. After graduating from Victoria University of Wellington with a BA in Anthropology, she completed a combined Masters Degree in Environmental Health, Waste Management and Epidemiology at Rutgers University.

Entrepreneur 
Returning to New Zealand, Clark-Reynolds launched her first entrepreneurial venture, a health and safety and Workers Compensation Insurance consultancy named GMV Associates. The consultancy was sold to Southern Cross and became Fusion, New Zealand's largest private Workers Compensation insurer.

In 2009, Clark-Reynolds began beta testing an environmentally-themed virtual world, MiniMonos, with interactive media producer Deborah Todd and game designer Noah Falstein, aiming to create an online place for children where fun came first but which taught them the values of looking after the planet. The site officially launched on 1 April 2011 and, by June 2012, had attracted close to 1 million players and £1 million in capital. MiniMonos closed in May 2013.

Professional director 
Clark-Reynolds became a professional director in 2013 and has since served with organizations including the Hillary Institute, Birthright New Zealand, Jasmax Architects, Atkins Ranch, Alpine Energy, Daffodil Enterprises Ltd, the NZ Future Bees Trust, Little Yellow Bird, Radio New Zealand, and Beef+Lamb New Zealand. Following training at MIT, Cambridge University, Stanford University and the Institute for the Future she began to specialise in applying foresight approaches. Clark-Reynolds has developed and taught strategy, digital governance and disruptive business models at the Institute of Directors in New Zealand.

References 

Living people
Officers of the New Zealand Order of Merit
Victoria University of Wellington alumni
Rutgers University alumni
1964 births
21st-century New Zealand businesswomen
21st-century New Zealand businesspeople